Craig Harrison (born November 1974) is a former Corporal of Horse (CoH) in the Blues and Royals, a cavalry regiment of the British Army, who from 2009 to 2017 held the record for the longest confirmed sniper kill in combat, at a range of . Craig Harrison is most famous for his military service in Afghanistan as a sniper but he also served in the British army in Iraq and the Balkans.

Discovering sniping
The first time Harrison used a sniper rifle was when firing a Dragunov sniper rifle (SVD) on a firing range near a British military base in Split, Croatia. In his autobiography The Longest Kill, Harrison described the rifle as looking like "an elongated AK" and after firing at a tree he says it "practically split the tree in half".

Record details
In November 2009, Harrison consecutively struck two Taliban machine gunners south of Musa Qala in Helmand Province in Afghanistan at a range of  using a L115A3 Long Range Rifle. In a BBC interview, Harrison reported it took about nine shots for him and his spotter to range the target, using a bracketing technique. Then, he reported, his first shot "on target" was a killing shot followed consecutively by a kill shot on a second machine gunner. The bodies were later found by Afghan National Police looking to retrieve the weapon (which had already been removed). The first Taliban was shot in the gut and the other through the side. Later in the day an Apache helicopter hovered over the firing position, using its laser range finder to measure the distance to the machine-gun position, confirming it was the longest kill in history at the time.

In the reports, Harrison mentions the environmental conditions were perfect for long range shooting: no wind, mild weather and clear visibility.

Ballistics and use of environment and equipment to achieve the aiming solution

This illustrates how differences in environmental conditions can significantly affect bullet flight.

The Schmidt & Bender MILITARY MK II 5–25×56mm scope used by Harrison on the L115A3 Long Range Rifle has windage and elevation adjustment of 0.1 milliradian (mil), double turn elevation turret, and parallax and illumination control. To increase the maximal elevation range Accuracy International produces mounts for telescopic sights with a 13.1 mil (45 MOA) built in vertical cant designed for their .338 Lapua Magnum rifles fitted with the 5–25×56 telescopic sight. Even with a 13.1 mil canted mount the employed sighting system is not able to dial in over 39.1 milliradian of vertical aiming correction, which is significantly less than Harrison required during his record shot.

The external ballistics software program by JBM Ballistics predicts that the bullets of British high pressure .338 Lapua Magnum cartridges using 16.2 g (250 gr) Lapua LockBase B408 bullets fired at  muzzle velocity under International Standard Atmosphere conditions at  elevation assuming shooting and target positions are at equal elevation and a  zero (the distance at which the rifle is sighted in) arrive at  distance after approximately 6.017 seconds flight time at  velocity and have dropped  (in angular units 48.9 milliradian , 168 MOA) on their way. Harrison had to use the P4 reticle offering 0.5 mil spaced holdover hash marks in his 5–25×56 telescopic sight to compensate for the lack of vertical aiming correction and thus achieve the required aiming solution. The long horizontal line at 5× zoom or magnification represent 49.1 milliradian (168.6 MOA) or slightly over the required assumed vertical elevation.

Private life 

Harrison's father and mother were dog handlers in the Royal Air Force Police (RAFP). They separated when he was very young. Harrison was the younger of two boys. He joined the Household Cavalry at 16, and later served in the Blues and Royals. He is married to Tanya and has a daughter.

After returning from Afghanistan in 2009 he developed post-traumatic stress disorder (PTSD) and was discharged from the army in 2014. He has stated since that:

The Ministry of Defence paid Harrison £100,000 in compensation for revealing his identity which put him at risk of kidnapping by Al-Qaeda supporters. The blunder led to Harrison being placed on permanent sick leave and then discharged.

Harrison has written The Longest Kill, about his life and career as a sniper.

Notes

References 

1974 births
Living people
British Army personnel of the War in Afghanistan (2001–2021)
Blues and Royals soldiers
British military snipers
People from Cheltenham
Military personnel from Gloucestershire